Saul Merin (August 25, 1933 – August 28, 2012) was an Israeli ophthalmologist specializing in the diagnosis and treatment of retinal and  genetic eye diseases.

Biography
Saul Merin was born in Poland. He escaped deportation by train to Auschwitz on August 3, 1943, and was hidden by Aniela (Zawadzka) Szwajce in Będzin, a town in southwest Poland, until arrival of the Soviet army in January 1945. He immigrated to Israel in 1949. 

In 1953-1960, he studied medicine at the Hebrew University in Jerusalem. After serving in the Israel Defense Forces from 1961–1963, he trained in ophthalmology at Hadassah Medical Center under Professor I.C. Michaelson in 1963–1969. For two years, 1965-1967,  he worked in Malawi and made several professional trips to Africa.

Medical and academic career
Merin was a professor of ophthalmology at  Hadassah Hospital. He also worked at the St John Eye Hospital Group's East Jerusalem hospital together with  Arab ophthalmologists. He was a visiting professor at The University of Illinois Eye and Ear Infirmary for 25 years.

He did additional training at the Hospital for Sick Children, Toronto, Ontario, Canada in pediatric ophthalmology, and at the University of Illinois at Chicago, Illinois, USA for further study of the retina.

He was Professor of Ophthalmology at Hebrew University from 1979 until his death. He was Chairman of the Israel Ophthalmological Society from 1976–1982, Chairman of the Israel Society for Vision and Eye Research from 1985–1995, Chairman of the Israel Board of Ophthalmology from 1989–1995, and Chairman of the Unit of Ophthalmology at Hadassah Hospital on Mount Scopus from 1979–1998.

Published works

See also
Health in Israel

References

Israeli ophthalmologists
Polish emigrants to Israel
Israeli medical researchers
1933 births
2012 deaths